The 1919–20 NCAA men's basketball season began in December 1919, progressed through the regular season, and concluded in March 1920.

Season headlines

 Penn of the Eastern Intercollegiate Basketball League met Chicago of the Big Ten Conference in a three-game national championship playoff, with the first game at Chicago, the second at Penn, and the third at Princeton University. Chicago won the first game 28–24, and Penn the second game, 29-18, after which Penn students celebrated all night and threw bricks and fired shots at policemen. Penn also won the third game, 23-21, to win the championship. On February 25, 1921, the Atlanta Constitution ran an article by sportswriter Walter Camp in which Camp observed that the Chicago-Penn championship series had demonstrated the need for a national standardization of college basketball rules and the interpretation of them and expressed the view that no way of determining a national champion yet existed in college basketball.
 NYU, led by Howard Cann, won the post-season Amateur Athletic Union (AAU) national championship tournament by defeating Rutgers, 49-24. NYU became the second of only four collegiate teams to win the tournament — in which a mix of collegiate and non-collegiate amateur teams competed — and the only one to do so between 1916 and 1924.
 In February 1943, the Helms Athletic Foundation retroactively selected Penn as its national champion for the 1919–20 season.
 In 1995, the Premo-Porretta Power Poll retroactively selected Penn as its national champion for the 1919–20 season.

Conference membership changes

Regular season

Conference winners

 Dartmouth was unable to field a team, so Eastern Intercollegiate Basketball League conference play was informal in 1919–20 and no official champion was declared. However, had a champion been named, Penn would have won the regular-season championship with a 7–1 conference record.

Conference standings

Premo-Porretta Power Poll
St. Bonaventure University accounting professor Patrick M. Premo and computer programmer Phil Porretta researched teams from the 1895–96 through the 1947–48 seasons, reviewing results, opponents, and margins of victory to create retroactive polls for the seasons predating the debut of the AP Poll. In 1995, they released their retroactive annual rankings as the Premo-Porretta Power Poll. Their poll for the 1919–20 season is below.

Statistical leaders

Award winners

Helms College Basketball All-Americans 

The practice of selecting a Consensus All-American Team did not begin until the 1928–29 season. The Helms Athletic Foundation later retroactively selected a list of All-Americans for the 1919–20 season.

Major player of the year awards

 Helms Foundation Player of the Year: Howard Cann, New York University

Coaching changes 

A number of teams changed coaches during the season and after it ended.

References